In trigonometry, Mollweide's formula is a pair of relationships between sides and angles in a triangle.

Thomas Simpson published the now-standard expression in 1748. Karl Mollweide republished the same result in 1808 without citing those predecessors.

It can be used to check the consistency of solutions of triangles.

Let a, b, and c be the lengths of the three sides of a triangle.
Let α, β, and γ be the measures of the angles opposite those three sides respectively.  Mollweide's formulas are

Relation to other trigonometric identities  

Because in a planar triangle  these identities can alternately be written in a form in which they are more clearly a limiting case of Napier's analogies for spherical triangles,

 

Dividing one by the other to eliminate  results in the law of tangents,

 

In terms of half-angle tangents alone, Mollweide's formula can be written as 

 

or equivalently

 

Multiplying the respective sides of these identities gives one half-angle tangent in terms of the three sides,

 

which becomes the law of cotangents after taking the square root,

 

where  is the semiperimeter.

The identities can also be proven equivalent to the law of sines and law of cosines.

Dual relations 

In spherical trigonometry, the law of cosines and derived identities such as Napier's analogies have precise duals swapping central angles measuring the sides and dihedral angles at the vertices. In the infinitesimal limit, the law of cosines for sides reduces to the planar law of cosines and two of Napier's analogies reduce to Mollweide's formulas above. But the law of cosines for angles degenerates to  By dividing squared side length by the spherical excess  we obtain a non-vanishing ratio, the spherical trigonometry relation:

In the infinitesimal limit, as the half-angle tangents of spherical sides reduce to lengths of planar sides, the half-angle tangent of spherical excess reduces to twice the area  of a planar triangle, so on the plane this is:

The first expresses the area in terms of two sides and the included angle, and the other is the law of sines:

We can alternately express the second formula in a form closer to one of Mollweide's formulas (again the law of tangents):

References

Further reading
 H. Arthur De Kleine, "Proof Without Words: Mollweide's Equation", Mathematics Magazine, volume 61, number 5, page 281, December, 1988.

Trigonometry
Theorems about triangles